The 2018 Cork Junior A Football Championship was the 120th staging of the Cork Junior A Football Championship since its establishment by the Cork County Board. The draw for the opening round fixtures took place on 10 December 2017.

The final was played on 27 October 2018 at Páirc Uí Rinn in Cork, between Dromtarriffe and Kilmacabea, in what was their first ever championship meeting. Dromtarriffe won the match by 2–09 to 2–08 to claim their fourth championship title overall and a first title in 59 years.

Results

Final

References

2018 in Irish sport
Cork Junior Football Championship